William Chervy (3 June 1937 – 12 February 2021) was a French politician. He was a member of the Socialist Party and served as Mayor of Saint-Vaury, General Councillor of the Canton of Saint-Vaury, and Senator from Creuse.

References

1937 births
2021 deaths
20th-century French politicians
Socialist Party (France) politicians
21st-century French politicians
Mayors of places in Nouvelle-Aquitaine
French Senators of the Fifth Republic
Senators of Creuse
Place of birth missing
Place of death missing